Brazil competed at the 2014 Winter Olympics in Sochi, Russia from 7 to 23 February 2014. With 13 athletes qualified, Brazil sent its largest ever team to the Winter Olympics, surpassing the ten it qualified for the 2002 Winter Olympics in Salt Lake City, United States. The 13 athletes also represent the third largest team from the Americas and the biggest of non-snowing countries.

Competitors

Jaqueline Mourão will also compete in cross-country skiing.

Alpine skiing 

According to the quota allocation released on December 30, 2013 Brazil has qualified two athletes. Brazil's two athletes are the same ones who represented the country in Vancouver four years earlier.

Biathlon

Pending reallocation of quotas, will allow Brazil to enter one female athlete. Jaqueline Mourão also competed in cross-country skiing.

Bobsleigh

Brazil's four man and two women bobsled teams have qualified.

* – Denotes the driver of each sled

Cross-country skiing

According to the quota allocation released on January 20, 2014 Brazil has qualified two athletes. Brazil's two athletes are the same ones who represented the country in Vancouver four years earlier.

Sprint

Figure skating

Isadora Williams qualified a quota spot by finishing in the top six countries qualified at the 2013 Nebelhorn Trophy. By doing so, she became the first figure skater to ever qualify from Brazil.

Freestyle skiing

Brazil has received one quota for women's aerials via reallocation. Originally Olympic gymnast Laís Souza was supposed to compete but a serious accident during training forced her to withdraw from the competition.

Aerials

Snowboarding

According to the quota allocation released on December 30, 2013 Brazil has qualified one athlete.

See also
Brazil at the 2014 Summer Youth Olympics
Brazil at the 2014 Winter Paralympics

References

External links 
 
 

Nations at the 2014 Winter Olympics
2014 Winter Olympics
Olympics